Vyronas is a suburban town and a municipality in the southeastern part of the Athens agglomeration, Greece. The town is named after George Gordon Byron, 6th Baron Byron, the famous English poet and writer, who is a national hero of Greece. Formerly part of the municipality of Athens, Vyronas was created as a community in 1933, and became a municipality in 1934. The municipality has an area of 9.204 km2.

Vyronas is an inner suburb of Athens, located about 3 km southeast of Athens city centre. Towards the southeast the municipality extends to the forested Hymettus mountain. The built-up area of Vyronas is continuous with that of municipality of Athens and the neighbouring suburbs Kaisariani, Ymittos and Ilioupoli. Motorway 64 runs through the southeastern part of the municipality.

Climate

Vyronas has a hot-summer Mediterranean climate (Köppen climate classification: Csa). Vyronas experiences cool, wet winters and hot, relatively dry summers.

Sites of interest
Vyronas National Stadium, which seats up to 4,340 and is 3 km from downtown Athens. It is home to the football club Athinaikos F.C. and their bitter rivals Doxa Vyronas F.C.
Theatro Vrachon, where the Vyronas Festival takes place every summer
Kareas Monastery, an orthodox monastery whose katholikon dates from the 11-12th century. It is located at the west slopes of Hymettus, near the site of an ancient quarry.

Schools

Schools include:
Philippine School in Greece

Sports
Sport facilities in Vyronas are the Vyronas National Stadium (football stadium) and the Ergani Indoor Hall (gymnasium). Clubs based in Vyronas is Athinaikos, club with many achievements in several sports and Doxa Vyronas F.C.

Historical population

See also
List of municipalities of Attica

References

External links
Official website 
Vironas News Portal 
Fire Department
Vironas Guide

Municipalities of Attica
Populated places in Central Athens (regional unit)
Lord Byron